The ninth running of the Tour of Flanders cycling classic was held on Sunday, 29 March 1925. Belgian Julien Delbecque won the race in a two-man sprint with Jef Pé. 25 of 57 riders finished.

Route
The race started and finished in Ghent – totaling 210 km. The course featured two categorized climbs:
 Tiegemberg
 Kwaremont

Results
!!Time
 ||align=right| 8h 49'
 ||align=right| s.t. 
 ||align=right| + 4' 45"
 ||align=right| s.t.
 ||align=right| s.t.
 ||align=right| + 9' 15"
 ||align=right| s.t.
 ||align=right| + 10' 15"
 ||align=right| s.t.
 ||align=right| s.t.

Note: Sources differ on the time differences for third to fifth place.

References

Tour of Flanders
1925 in road cycling
1925 in Belgian sport
March 1925 sports events